St. Joseph Cathedral  is a Catholic cathedral at 1535 Third Avenue in the Cortez Hill neighborhood of downtown San Diego, California. It is the seat of the Diocese of San Diego.

History

The parish was founded in 1874 and the first sanctuary was a frame building at Third and Beech built in 1875 under the leadership of Antonio Ubach on land donated by Alonzo Horton. Adjacent to the church was an adobe house where Ubach lived. The church was dedicated the same year by Bishop Francis Mora. In 1894, the parish completed and dedicated a much larger brick church.

St. Joseph became a cathedral in 1936, when the Holy See established the Diocese of San Diego from part of the Archdiocese of Los Angeles. The cathedral is built on the site of the earlier churches and was dedicated in 1941. St. Joseph underwent restoration work in 2011 which included repainting and restoring exterior wood and concrete.  Earlier work upgraded restrooms and accessibility to the facility while additional work is planned when funding is in place.

Present day
St. Joseph's Cathedral offers public liturgies every day of the week, including a Sunday Mass in Spanish.  A young adult ministry, confessions, and devotions are also available.

The cathedral frequently hosts concerts by the San Diego Chamber Orchestra and other classical groups.

Pastors
Antonio Ubach, 1874–1907
Bernard Smyth, 1907-1912
Joseph Nunan, 1912-1914
Eugene A. Heffernan, 1914-1919
John J. Brady, 1919-1929
John M. Hegarty, 1929-1940
Franklin Hurd, 1940-1947
Francis Dillon, 1947-1954
William A. Bergin, 1954-1955
George M. Rice, 1955-1969
Anthony Giesing, 1969-1976
Rudolph Galindo, 1976-1983
Gilbert E. Chavez, 1983-2007
Peter Escalante, 2007-2015
Patrick Mulcahy, 2015-2019
Peter Navarra, 2019-Present

See also
List of Catholic cathedrals in the United States
List of cathedrals in the United States

References

External links

Official Cathedral Site
Roman Catholic Diocese of San Diego Official Site

Religious organizations established in 1874
Roman Catholic churches completed in 1941
Joseph, St., San Diego
Churches in San Diego County, California
Mission Revival architecture in California
Churches in San Diego
1874 establishments in California
20th-century Roman Catholic church buildings in the United States